HK36 may refer to:
 The Diamond HK36 Super Dimona motor glider
 The Heckler & Koch HK36 experimental assault rifle of the 1970s
 The Heckler & Koch G36 assault rifle of the 1990s
 The Hokejový Klub 36 Skalica professional ice hockey team